Metcalfia is a genus of plants in the grass family. It contains a single species, Metcalfia mexicana, native to Mexico.

References

Pooideae
Monotypic Poaceae genera